Martine Desjardins is a Canadian activist and media figure from Quebec. She was president of the Fédération étudiante universitaire du Québec during the 2012 Quebec student protests and was a Parti québecois candidate in the 2014 Quebec general election. Since then, she has been a political commentator for Le Canal Nouvelles, and was president of the Mouvement national des Québécoises et des Québécois from 2015 to 2017.

References  

1981 births
Living people
Activists from Montreal
Canadian activists
Parti Québécois candidates in Quebec provincial elections